Bissonnet or Bissonnette is a surname. Notable people with the surname include:

Bissonnet

 Alfred Pike Bissonnet (1914–79), Canadian diplomat
 Michel Bissonnet (born 1942), Canadian politician, Speaker of the Quebec National Assembly
 Bissonnet Street in Houston, Texas, USA

Bissonnette

 Alexandre Bissonnette, Canadian mass murderer
 André Bissonnette (born 1945), Canadian businessman and politician
 Anik Bissonnette (born 1962), Canadian dancer
 Bernard Bissonnette (1898 – 1964) was a lawyer, merchant, educator, judge and political figure in Quebec.
 Father Bernard Bissonnette, central figure in the Bridgeport child abuse scandal.
 Big Bill Bissonnette (born 1937), American jazz trombonist and producer
 J.-Eugène Bissonnette (1892–1980), Canadian politician and physician
 Gaétan Bissonnette (born 1958), Canadian murderer of actress Denise Morelle
 Joel Bissonnette, American actor
 Lise Bissonnette (born 1945), Canadian writer
 Matt Bissonnette (disambiguation), several people
 Michael D. Bissonnette, American politician
 Paul Bissonnette (born 1985), Canadian ice hockey player
 Pierre-André Bissonnette (died 1989), Canadian diplomat

See also
 Bisson

French-language surnames